Otisville Correctional Facility is a medium-security state prison located in Orange County, New York,  United States.  It is located adjacent to the federal system prison (Federal Correctional Institution, Otisville), but each facility operates separately from the other and they are otherwise unrelated.  Both are in the Town of Mount Hope.

The site was used as a tuberculosis sanitarium (1906–1955), a Division of Youth facility (Otisville Training Facility, up to 1972), and briefly a drug treatment center, before it became a state prison.  A sawmill for lumber and maple syrup production were soon introduced for prisoner work.  Due to the length of the prison fence and rough terrain, exterior guards are mounted on horses.

References

External links
  New York prison information

1976 establishments in New York (state)
Buildings and structures in Orange County, New York
Economy of Orange County, New York
Prisons in New York (state)